The Estonian Ministry of Justice is the Ministry of Justice of Estonia.
The Minister of Justice is the senior minister at the Ministry of Justice in the Estonian Government. The Ministry is responsible for providing support to the court system and providing legal focus in proposing new laws.

Duties and structures
Ministry of Justice has following duties and structures:
 Prisons (Estonian Department of Prisons)
 The Prosecutor's Office
 Courts
 Patent Office
 Estonian Competition Authority
 Data Protection Inspectorate
 Estonian Forensic Institute
 Centre of Registers and Information Systems

List of ministers
Jüri Raidla (3 April 1990 – 30 January 1992)
Märt Rask (30 January 1992 – 21 October 1992)
Kaido Kama (21 October 1992 – 23 May 1994)
Urmas Arumäe (2 June 1994 – 8 November 1994)
Jüri Adams (8 November 1994 – 17 April 1995)
Paul Varul (17 April 1995 – 6 November 1995; 6 November 1995 – 17 March 1997; 17 March 1997 – 25 March 1999)
Märt Rask (25 March 1999 – 28 January 2002; 28 January 2002 – 10 April 2003)
Ken-Marti Vaher (10 April 2003 – 13 April 2005)
Rein Lang (13 April 2005 – 5 April 2007; 5 April 2007 – 5 April 2011)
Kristen Michal (6 April 2011 – 10 December 2012)
Hanno Pevkur (10 December 2012 – 26 March 2014)
Andres Anvelt (26 March 2014 – 9 April 2015)
Urmas Reinsalu (9 April 2015 – 29 April 2019)
Raivo Aeg (29 April 2019 – 26 January 2021)
Maris Lauri (26 January 2021 – 18 July 2022)
Lea Danilson-Järg (18 July 2022 – )

See also
 Justice ministry
 Politics of Estonia

References

External links
 

Justice
Estonia
Law of Estonia